João António dos Anjos Rocha was an entrepreneur and Portuguese sports manager. He was president of Sporting CP between September 7, 1973 and October 3, 1986.

During his presidency numerous business projects were realized, including the first project of club-company in Portugal, approved by the partners in November 1973, denominated "Society of Constructions and Planning".

The current pavilion of Sporting Clube de Portugal was named Pavilhão João Rocha in order to honor the former president.

References

Portuguese business executives
Sporting CP presidents
1930 births
2013 deaths
People from Setúbal